Polygala curtissii, the Curtiss' milkwort or Appalachian milkwort, is a species of flowering plant in the milkwort family. It is native to the Southeastern United States, where it is found primarily in the southern Appalachian Mountains and the Piedmont. Its natural habitat is open, sandy meadows, and woodlands.

It is an annual that produces pink-purple flowers in the summer.

References

curtissii